This worldwide list of music museums encompasses past and present museums that focus on musicians, musical instruments or other musical subjects.

Argentina 
  – Mina Clavero
 Academia Nacional del Tango de la República Argentina – Buenos Aires
  – La Plata
 , dedicated to The Beatles – Buenos Aires

Armenia 
 House-Museum of Aram Khachaturian, dedicated to Aram Khachaturian – Yerevan
 Charles Aznavour Museum, dedicated to Charles Aznavour – Yerevan

Australia 
 National Film and Sound Archive – Acton, Australian Capital Territory
 Tandanya National Aboriginal Cultural Institute – Adelaide, South Australia
 National Library of Australia – Canberra, Australian Capital Territory
 Australian Country Music Hall of Fame – Tamworth, New South Wales
 Slim Dusty Centre – Kempsey, New South Wales
 Grainger Museum, dedicated to Percy Grainger – University of Melbourne, Victoria
 Australian Performing Arts Collection – Melbourne
 Arts Centre Melbourne, musical collection – Melbourne
 ARIA Hall of Fame – Melbourne
 Australian Jazz Museum – Wantirna, Victoria

Austria 

 Dedicated to composers
dedicated to Ludwig van Beethoven
 Beethoven-Haus– Krems an der Donau
  – Baden bei Wien, Vienna
  (1973–2013) – Floridsdorf, Vienna
 , musical collection – Floridsdorf
  – Vienna
  – Vienna
  – Vienna
 Beethoven-Haus Probusgasse – Vienna

dedicated to Anton Bruckner
 Anton Bruckner Museum – Ansfelden
  – Kronstorf

dedicated to Johannes Brahms and/or Joseph Haydn
 Brahms Museum, Mürzzuschlag – Mürzzuschlag
  with Brahms room – Vienna
  – Eisenstadt
 Haydnkirche – Eisenstadt
 Haydn's birthplace, dedicated to Joseph and Michael Haydn – Rohrau

dedicated to Gustav Mahler
 Composing hut of Gustav Mahler – Steinbach am Attersee
 Composing hut of Gustav Mahler – Maiernigg near Maria Wörth

dedicated to Wolfgang Amadeus Mozart and/or family members
  dedicated to Nannerl Mozart and her mother – St. Gilgen
 Mozart's birthplace – Salzburg
 , dedicated to the whole family – Salzburg
 Mozarthaus – Vienna

dedicated to Franz Schubert
  – Atzenbrugg
 Schubert's birthplace – Vienna
  – Vienna

dedicated to the Strauss family
 Museum der Johann Strauss Dynastie, dedicated to the family Strauss – Vienna
 , dedicated to Johann Strauss II – Vienna

dedicated to Arnold Schoenberg
  – Mödling
 Arnold Schönberg Center – Vienna

dedicated to other composers
 , partly dedicated to Franz von Suppé – Gars am Kamp
 Lehár Villa, dedicated to Franz Lehár – Bad Ischl
 , dedicated to Carl Zeller – St. Peter in der Au
 Liszthaus, dedicated to Franz Liszt – Raiding
 Pleyel Museum, dedicated to Ignaz Pleyel – Ruppersthal, near Großweikersdorf

 Vienna (other museums)
 , dedicated to Fatty George
 Haus der Musik
 Kunsthistorisches Museum, musical collection
 Vienna Technical Museum, musical collection

 Other museums
 Eboardmuseum – Klagenfurt
  – Kremsmünster
 , partly dedicated to Silent Night – Oberndorf bei Salzburg
  – Ratten

Azerbaijan 
 Azerbaijan State Museum of Musical Culture – Baku

Belarus 
 , dedicated to Czesław Niemen – Staryya Vasilishki

Belgium 
East and West Flanders
 Jazz Center Flanders, with jazz museum – Dendermonde
 Peter Benoit Huis, dedicated to Peter Benoit – Harelbeke
 Organ collection Ghysels – Kallo, Beveren
  – Koekelare
  (2012–2017) – Menen

Province of Antwerp
 Museum Vleeshuis – Antwerp
 Harmonium Art museuM – Klein-Willebroek
 Royal Carillon School "Jef Denyn", dedicated to Jef Denyn – Mechelen
  – Voortkapel, Westerlo

Brussels and Flemish Brabant
 , musical collection – Brussels
 Musical Instrument Museum – Brussels
  – Gooik
 South-West Brabant Museum, collection of cellist François Servais and family – Halle
 Jazz Station – Saint-Josse-ten-Noode
 Brabant Center for Music Traditions – Kampenhout
  (1979–1996) – Schaerbeek

Limburg
  – Hasselt
  (?–2014) – Peer
 Armand Preud'homme Museum (1990–2018), dedicated to Armand Preud'homme – Peer

Wallonia
 Mr Sax's House, dedicated to Adolphe Sax – Dinant
 Bell and Carillon Museum (1992–2013) – Tellin

Brazil 
  – Bauru
  – Campinas
  – Campo Grande
  – Ceará
  – Cuiabá
Museu da Imagem e do Som de Alagoas – Maceió
  – Minas Gerais
  – Pará
 , dedicated to Luiz Gonzaga – Pernambuco
 Museu da Imagem e do Som do Rio de Janeiro – Rio de Janeiro
Reggae Maranhão Museum – São Luís
 Villa-Lobos Museum, dedicated to Heitor Villa-Lobos – Rio de Janeiro
 São Paulo Museum of Image and Sound – São Paulo

Burkina Faso 
 Musée de Manega, musical collection – Oubritenga
 National Musical Museum – Ouagadougou

Canada 
British Columbia, Alberta and Saskatchewan
 Gervais Wheels Museum – Alida, Saskatchewan
 National Music Centre – Calgary
 Creative Kids Museum, musical collection – Calgary
 Canadian Music Hall of Fame – Calgary
 Canadian Songwriters Hall of Fame – Calgary
 Canadian Country Music Hall of Fame – Merritt
 Revelstoke Nickelodeon Museum – Revelstoke

Nova Scotia and Quebec
 Musée des ondes Emile Berliner dedicated to the history of music recording – Montreal
 Celtic Music Interpretive Centre – Judique
 Hank Snow Home Town Museum, dedicated to Hank Snow – Liverpool
 Musée de l'Accordéon – Montmagny
 Anne Murray Centre, dedicated to Anne Murray – Springhill

Ontario
 Forest City Gallery, musical collection – London
 Youngtown Rock and Roll Museum, dedicated to Neil Young – Omemee
 Franco-Ontarian Folklore Centre – Greater Sudbury
 Shania Twain Centre (2001–2013), dedicated to Shania Twain – Timmins
 Ontario Science Centre, musical collection – Flemingdon Park, Toronto
 Barn Dance Historical Society Entertainment Museum – Wingham

Cape Verde 
 Museu da Tabanka, dedicated to tabanka music – Assomada

China 

 Choir Organ Museum – Gulangyu, Fujian
 Gulangyu Piano Museum – Gulangyu, Fujian
 Heilongjiang Music Museum, musical instruments – Harbin, province of Heilongjiang
 Drum Tower of Xi'an – Xi'an, province Shaanxi
 Wuhan Museum, musical instruments collection – Wuhan, province of Hubei

Czech Republic 

 dedicated to composers
dedicated to Antonín Dvořák
  – Nelahozeves
 Antonín Dvořák Museum – Prague
  – Sychrov
  – Vysoká u Příbramě
  – Zlonice

dedicated to Leoš Janáček
  – Brno
  – Hukvaldy

dedicated to Bedřich Smetana
  – Jabkenice
  – Litomyšl
  – Obříství
 Bedřich Smetana Museum – Prague

dedicated to other composers
 Josef Suk Museum, dedicated to Josef Suk – Křečovice
 , dedicated to Paul Wranitzky, Antonín Vranický and Jan Novák – Nová Říše

 , dedicated to Bohuslav Martinů – Polička
 Bertramka (temporally closed), dedicated to Wolfgang Amadeus Mozart – Prague
  – Modrý pokoj, dedicated to Jaroslav Ježek – Prague
 , dedicated to František Drdla – Žďár nad Sázavou

 Other museums
 Music Without Musicians – Hořovice
  – Ostrava
  – Prague
 Lobkowicz Palace, partly dedicated to classical music – Prague
  – Prague
  – Lesonice
 , collection bagpipes – Strakonice

Denmark 
  – Knebel
The Danish Music Museum (Musikmuseet) – Copenhagen
 Carl Nielsen Museum, dedicated to Carl Nielsen – Odense
 Memphis Mansion, dedicated to Elvis Presley – Randers
  – Roskilde
 Nysted Orgelmuseum – Nysted

Estonia 
 Estonian Theatre and Music Museum – Tallinn

Finland 
 Ainola, dedicated to Jean Sibelius – Järvenpää
 Military Music Museum of Finland – Lahti
 Sibelius Museum, dedicated to Jean Sibelius – Turku
  – Varkaus
 Villa Kokkonen, dedicated to Joonas Kokkonen – Järvenpää

France 
Paris
 Musée des Arts et Métiers – 3rd arrondissement
 Salon Frédéric Chopin, dedicated to Frédéric Chopin – 4th arrondissement
 Bibliothèque-Musée de l'Opéra National de Paris – 9th arrondissement
 Musée du Hard Rock Café – 9th arrondissement
 Musée Édith Piaf, dedicated to Édith Piaf – 11th arrondissement
 Musée-Placard d'Erik Satie, dedicated to Erik Satie – 18th arrondissement
 Musée de la Musique – 19th arrondissement
 Phono Museum (France) – 9th arrondissement

Other museums
 Musée de la musique – Anduze
 Josephine Baker Museum, Château des Milandes, dedicated to Josephine Baker – Castelnaud-la-Chapelle
 Museum of Musical Instruments, Céret – Céret
 Musée de l'art forain et de la musique mécanique – Conflans-en-Jarnisy
 Musée Hector-Berlioz – birthplace of Hector Berlioz – La Côte-Saint-André
  – La Couture-Boussey
 Musée Claude-Debussy, dedicated to Claude Debussy – Saint-Germain-en-Laye
 Musée de la musique mécanique – Les Gets
 Maisons Satie, dedicated to Erik Satie – Honfleur
  – L'Isle-Jourdain, Gers
  – Limoux
 Musée de la musique mécanique – Mirecourt
 Musée de la Lutherie et de l'Archèterie françaises – Mirecourt
 , dedicated to Maurice Ravel – Montfort-l'Amaury
  – Montluçon
 Palais Lascaris, musical instruments museum – Nice
 Musée de la chanson française – La Planche
  – Steenwerck

Germany 
Baden-Württemberg
 Brahms House, dedicated to Johannes Brahms – Baden-Baden
 Deutsches Musikautomaten-Museum – Bruchsal
 , partly dedicated to Joseph Martin Kraus – Buchen
 Augustiner Museum, musical instruments collection – Freiburg
 German Phono Museum – Sankt Georgen im Schwarzwald
 Glockenmuseum Stiftskirche – Herrenberg
  – Lautlingen, Albstadt
  – Mannheim
 House of Music − Stuttgart
  – Trossingen
 , collection mechanical musical instruments – Waldkirch
 , dedicated to Friedrich Silcher – Weinstadt-Schnait

Bavaria

 , dedicated to Leopold and Wolfgang Amadeus Mozart – Augsburg
 , dedicated to E. T. A. Hoffmann – Bamberg
 , dedicated to Franz Liszt – Bayreuth
 House Wahnfried, dedicated to Richard Wagner – Bayreuth
 , partly dedicated to Christoph Willibald Gluck – Berching
 , dedicated to Carl Orff – Dießen am Ammersee
 , dedicated to Werner Egk – Donauwörth
  – Feuchtwangen
 , dedicated to Richard Strauss – Garmisch-Partenkirchen
  – Mittenwald
  – Munich
  – Ostheim vor der Rhön
 , with a collection of Adolf von Henselt – Schwabach
  – Valley
 , dedicated to Vinzenz, Franz and Ignaz Lachner – Rain

Berlin and Brandenburg
  – Beeskow
 , Bad Belzig
 , dedicated to Bartolomeo Cristofori – Berlin-Gesundbrunnen
 Ramones Museum, dedicated to the Ramones – Berlin-Kreuzberg
 Berlin Musical Instrument Museum – Berlin-Tiergarten
 , dedicated to August Friedrich, Johann Gottlieb and Carl Heinrich Graun – Bad Liebenwerda
 , dedicated to Xaver and Philipp Scharwenka – Bad Saarow

Hamburg, Schleswig-Holstein and Mecklenburg-Vorpommern

 , partly dedicated to Carl Maria von Weber – Eutin
 , dedicated to Johannes Brahms – Heide
 Composers Quarter Hamburg – Hamburg-Neustadt
 Brahms Museum, dedicated to Johannes Brahms
 Telemann Museum, dedicated to Georg Philipp Telemann
 Carl Philipp Emanuel Bach Museum, dedicated to Carl Philipp Emanuel Bach
 Johann Adolph Hasse Museum, dedicated to Johann Adolph Hasse
 Gustav Mahler Museum, dedicated to Gustav Mahler
 Fanny & Felix Mendelssohn Museum, dedicated to Fanny and Felix Mendelssohn
 Hamburg Museum, musical collection – Hamburg-Neustadt
 Beatlemania Hamburg (2009–2012), dedicated to The Beatles – Hamburg-St. Pauli
  (1987–2013) – Hamburg-Winterhude
  – Kröpelin
 Brahms-Institut, dedicated to Johannes Brahms and other composers – Lübeck
 Mecklenburgisches Orgelmuseum – Malchow

North Rhine-Westphalia, Lower Saxony and Bremen
 , piano museum – Bergheim
 Beethoven House, dedicated to Ludwig van Beethoven – Bonn
 , dedicated to Robert Schumann – Bonn-Endenich
  – Borgentreich
  (2011–2013), dedicated to Elvis Presley – Düsseldorf
  (?-2011) – Goslar
  – Gronau
 , musical instruments collection – Hattingen
 – Extertal
 Stones Fan Museum, dedicated to The Rolling Stones – Lüchow
  (2009–2013) – Monschau
 , dedicated to Friedrich Fleiter – Münster-Nienberge
  – Schwarmstedt
  – Weener

Rhineland-Palatinate, Saarland and Hesse
 , partly dedicated to Elvis Presley – Friedberg
 , dedicated to Paul Hindemith – Frankfurt
 , dedicated to Louis Spohr – Kassel
 , dedicated to Ludwig van Beethoven – Koblenz
  – Ortenberg-Lißberg
  – Rüdesheim am Rhein
 Musikantenland Museum – Thallichtenberg
  – Windesheim

Saxony and Saxony-Anhalt

 Villa Teresa, dedicated to Eugen d'Albert and Teresa Carreño – Coswig
 Kurt Weill Centre, dedicated to Kurt Weill – Dessau-Roßlau
 Carl Maria von Weber Museum, dedicated to Carl Maria von Weber – Dresden-Hosterwitz
 , dedicated to Richard Wagner – Dresden-Graupa
 , dedicated to Gottfried Silbermann – Frauenstein
 , dedicated to Rudolf and Erhard Mauersberger – Großrückerswalde
 , dedicated to The Beatles – Halle
 Wilhelm Friedemann Bach House, dedicated to seven composers – Halle
 Handel House, dedicated to Georg Friedrich Händel – Halle
  – Klosterhäseler
 , collection Johann Sebastian Bach – Köthen
 Mendelssohn House, Leipzig, dedicated to Felix and Fanny Mendelssohn – Leipzig
 Bach Museum Leipzig, dedicated to Johann Sebastian Bach – Leipzig
 , dedicated to Edvard Grieg – Leipzig
 Museum of Musical Instruments of Leipzig University – Leipzig
 Schumann House, Leipzig, dedicated to Robert and Clara Schumann – Leipzig
 , dedicated to Carl Loewe – Löbejün
  – Markneukirchen
 Lindenmuseum Clara Schumann, dedicated to Clara Schumann – Müglitztal
 , dedicated to Reinhard Keiser, Johann Christian Schieferdecker, Johann David Heinichen, and Johann Friedrich Fasch – Teuchern
 Heinrich Schütz House, dedicated to Heinrich Schütz – Weißenfels
 Robert Schumann House, dedicated to Robert Schumann – Zwickau

Thuringia
 , partly dedicated to Johann Sebastian Bach – Arnstadt
  (1988–2009) – Bechstedtstraß
 Bachhaus, dedicated to Johann Sebastian Bach – Eisenach
 , dedicated to Richard Wagner – Eisenach
 Heinrich Schütz House, dedicated to Heinrich Schütz – Bad Köstritz
 , dedicated to Max Reger – Meiningen
 Museum im Schloss Elisabethenburg, musical history and instruments – Meiningen
 , dedicated to the Bach family and violins craft – Wechmar
 , dedicated to Franz Liszt – Weimar

Ghana 
 Gramophone Records Museum and Research Centre of Ghana – Cape Coast

Greece 

 Museum of Greek Folk Musical Instruments – Plaka, Athens
 Music Museum "Nikolaos Chalikiopoulos Mantzaros", dedicated to Nikolaos Mantzaros – Corfu
 Museum of Ancient Greek, Byzantine and Post-Byzantine Musical Instruments – Thessaloniki
  – Thessaloniki

Guatemala 
 Museo Casa K'ojom, at the Centro Cultural la Azotea, dedicated to Maya music – Jocotenango, Sacatepéquez

Hungary 
 Budapest
 Béla Bartók Memorial House, dedicated to Béla Bartók
 , dedicated to Franz Liszt
 , dedicated to Zoltán Kodály
 Museum of Music History

 Other museums
 Egri Road Beatles Múzeum, dedicated to The Beatles – Eger
 , dedicated to Ludwig van Beethoven – Martonvásár

Iceland 
 The Icelandic Museum of Rock 'n' Roll – Reykjanesbær
 Folk Music Centre – Siglufjörður

India 

 Indian Music Experience: an interactive music museum – Bangalore
 Karnataka Folk Museum, musical collection – Bangalore
 Melody World Wax Museum, musical instruments collection (tribal, ethnic, folk & modern) − Mysore
 Melody World Wax Museum − Mysore

Indonesia 
  – Malang

Iran 
 Tehran Museum of Music – Tehran

Ireland 
 Irish Rock N Roll Museum – Dublin
 Irish Music Hall of Fame – Dublin (1999-2001)

Israel 
 the Hebrew Music Museu  – Jerusalem
 Violins of Hope – Tel Aviv

Italy 

 Northern Italy
  – Alessandria
 Gustav Mahler Stube, with memorial dedicated to Gustav Mahler – Altschluderbach, Toblach
 Donizetti's birthplace, dedicated to Gaetano Donizetti – Bergamo
 Donizetti Museum, dedicated to Gaetano Donizetti – Bergamo
 Museo internazionale e biblioteca della musica – Bologna
 Oratorium of San Colombano – Bologna
 , dedicated to Giuseppe Verdi – Busseto
 , dedicated to Giuseppe Verdi – Busseto
 Villa Verdi, dedicated to Giuseppe Verdi – Busseto
 Civic Museum of Crema, musical collection – Crema
 Museo del violino – Cremona
 Museo Civico Ala Ponzone – Cremona
 , dedicated to Fabrizio De André – Genoa
  – Genoa
 Collezione Didattica piccolo Museo della Musica – Lodi
 Fondo Musicale Greggiati, dedicated to Giuseppe Greggiati – Mantua
 Museum of Musical Instruments – Milan
 Museo Teatrale alla Scala, musical collection – Milan
 , dedicated to Arturo Toscanini – Parma
 Museo storico Riccardo Barilla del Conservatorio di Parma – Parma
  – Roncegno
 Museo Etnografico e dello Strumento Musicale a Fiato – Quarna Sotto
 , musical collection – Trieste
 Museo della Canzone – Vallecrosia
 San Maurizio, dedicated to music of Baroque Venice – Venice
 Museo Wagner, dedicated to Richard Wagner – Ca' Vendramin Calergi, Venice
  – Verona

 Central Italy
  – Castelfidardo
  – Florence
 , dedicated to Enrico Caruso – Lastra a Signa
 , dedicated to Gaspare Spontini – Maiolati Spontini
  – Massa Marittima
 , dedicated to Titta Ruffo – Pisa
 Casa Natale di Rossini, dedicated to Gioachino Rossini – Pesaro
 Accademia Nazionale di Santa Cecilia Musical Instruments Museum – Rome
 Museo Storico, part of the Teatro Argentina – Rome
 Museo nazionale degli strumenti musicali – Rome
 Museo della Zampogna, bagpipe museum – Scapoli
 Accademia Musicale Chigiana – Siena
  – Talla
 Villa Puccini, estate of Giacomo Puccini – Torre del Lago

 Southern Italy
 Museum of Multiethnic Musical Instruments "Fausto Cannone" – Alcamo
 Museum of Castle of Gesualdo, dedicated to Carlo Gesualdo – Gesualdo
  – Isca sullo Ionio
  – Naples
 , partly dedicated to Francesco Cilea and Nicola Manfroce – Palmi, Reggio Calabria

Jamaica 

 Bob Marley Museum, dedicated to Bob Marley – Nine Mile
 Bob Marley Mausoleum – Kingston

Japan 

 Tokyo
 Michio Miyagi Memorial Hall, dedicated to Michio Miyagi
  (?–2013), mechanical musical instruments
 Museum of the Musashino Academia Musicae
 Min-On Musical Museum

 Other museums
Mandolin Melodies Museum – Aichi
  – Fujikawaguchiko
 Musical Instruments Museum – Hamamatsu
  – Izu, Itō
  – Kobe
 The Museum, successor of  – Matsushima
  – Misasa
  – Nasu
  – Saikai
  – Nishinomiya
  – Mimasaka
  – Osaka
 Otaru Music Box Museum – Otaru
 John Lennon Museum (2000–2010), dedicated to John Lennon – Saitama
  – Shizuoka
  (2000-2010), organ museum – Tendō

Kazakhstan 
 Kazakh Museum of Folk Musical Instruments – Almaty

Latvia 
 Krišjānis Barons Memorial Museum, devoted to folklorist Krišjānis Barons and his work collecting Latvian folk songs (Dainas) – Riga

Lithuania 
 Povilas Stulga Museum of Lithuanian Folk Instruments, named after Povilas Stulga – Kaunas
 Maironis Lithuanian Literature Museum – Kaunas
 Lithuanian Theater, Music and Cinema Museum/Lietuvos teatro, muzikos ir kino muziejus – Vilnius

Madagascar 
 University of Madagascar's Museum of Art and Archaeology, collection of musical instruments – Antananarivo

Mexico 
 Museum of the Yucatecan Song – Mérida
 Casa de la Música Mexicana – Mexico City
  – Mexico City

Mongolia 
 Mongolian Theatre Museum – Ulaanbaatar

Netherlands 

North
  (1987–2008) – Assen
  – Barger-Compascuum
  – Eelde
  – Gasselternijveenschemond
 , dedicated to Cuby + Blizzards – Grolloo
 , dedicated to Elvis Presley – Molkwerum
  – Stadskanaal
  (2008–2012) – de Wijk

West
 , dedicated to The Beatles – Alkmaar
 Geelvinck Early Piano Museum – Amsterdam
 Museum Geelvinck-Hinlopen (1991–2015) – Amsterdam
  (1997–2011/14), dedicated to Willy Alberti – Amsterdam
  – Amsterdam
  – Amsterdam
 Gemeentemuseum Den Haag, musical collection – The Hague
  (1905–1935) – The Hague
 Barrel Organ Museum Haarlem – Haarlem
 Netherlands Institute for Sound and Vision – Hilversum
  – Hook of Holland
  – Volendam
  – Vlaardingen

Centre and east
  – Bennekom
 , dedicated to Elvis Presley – Culemborg
  – Elburg
 Museum Geelvinck Kolthoorn – Heerde
  – Malden
  – Nieuwleusen
 , dedicated to Radio Veronica and Demis Roussos – Nijkerk
  – Paasloo, Steenwijkerland
 Museum Speelklok – Utrecht
 Geelvinck Music Museum Zutphen (2016–2019) – Zutphen
  – Zwolle

South
  – Asten
 , named after Anselmo Gavioli – Helmond
  – Hilvarenbeek
  – Sint-Oedenrode
  – Tilburg

New Zealand 
 , dedicated to Elvis Presley – Hawera
 Whittaker's Live Musical Museum – Auckland

Norway 

 Edvard Grieg Museum Troldhaugen, dedicated to Edvard Grieg – Bergen
 Siljustøl, dedicated to Harald Sæverud, Bergen
 Ringve Museum – Lade
 Villa Lysøen, dedicated to Ole Bull – Os, Hordaland
 Rockheim – Trondheim
 , dedicated to Torgeir Augundsson – Vinje

Philippines 
 Jose R. Gullas Halad Museum – Cebu City

Poland 
dedicated to Frédéric Chopin
 Fryderyk Chopin Museum – Warsaw
 Chopin family parlor – Warsaw
 Birthplace of Frédéric Chopin – Żelazowa Wola

dedicated to other musicians
 , dedicated to Feliks Nowowiejski – Barczewo
 Villa Atma, dedicated to Karol Szymanowski – Zakopane
 Museum of Vladimir Vysotsky in Koszalin, dedicated to Vladimir Vysotsky – Koszalin

Other museums
  – Będomin
  – Katowice
  – Poznań
  – Szyba
  – Szydłowiec
  – Wejherowo

Portugal 
 Museum of Portuguese Music – Estoril
  – Lisbon
 Museu Nacional da Música – Lisbon
 Museum of the Hot Club of Portugal – Lisbon
 Stringed Instruments Museum, string instruments museum – Tebosa
 Museu Fernando Lopes-Graça, dedicated to Fernando Lopes-Graça – Tomar

Puerto Rico 

 Casa del Compositor Héctor Flores Osuna, dedicated to Héctor Flores Osuna – Caguas
 Casa del Trovador – Caguas
 Centro Musical Criollo José Ignacio Quintón, dedicated to José Ignacio Quintón – Caguas
 Casa Paoli, dedicated to Antonio Paoli – Barrio Cuarto, Ponce
 Museo de la Música Puertorriqueña – Barrio Tercero, Ponce
  – San Juan
 Museum of Reggaeton and Daddy Yankee – at Plaza Las Américas Mall

Reunion 
 , also 'Musée des musiques et instruments de l'océan Indien' – Hell-Bourg

Romania 
 Luminiș Villa, dedicated to George Enescu – Cumpătu, Sinaia

Russia 

Moscow
 
 Harmonica Museum, dedicated to Alfred Mirek
 Museum of Vladimir Vysotsky at Taganka Square, dedicated to Vladimir Vysotsky

Saint Petersburg
 Temple of Love, Peace and Music, dedicated to John Lennon
 Kamchatka, house of Viktor Tsoi
 Museum of the Alexandrinsky Theatre
St.Petersburg State Museum, and branches:
 House and Museum of Feodor Chaliapin
The Museum of Music and Music Instruments at the Count Sheremetev Palace
 Rimsky-Korsakov Apartment and Museum, dedicated to Nikolai Rimsky-Korsakov
The Samoilov Actors' Family Museum

Other museums
 Museum of Sergei Taneyev, dedicated to Sergei Taneyev – Dyudkovo, Zvenigorod
 Museum Music and Time – Yaroslavl
 Tchaikovsky State House-Museum, dedicated to Pyotr Ilyich Tchaikovsky en Sergei Taneyev – Klin
 Rockmuseum – Ufa
 Ivanovka, former summer residence of Sergei Rachmaninoff – Tambov
 Musical Instrument Museum – Volgograd
 Tsjaikovski Museum, dedicated to Pyotr Ilyich Tchaikovsky – Votkinsk

Slovakia 
 Slovak National Museum – Bratislava
 Guitar museum – Sobrance

Slovenia 
 Birth House of Hugo Wolf – Ljubljana
 The Rolling Stones Museum, dedicated to The Rolling Stones – Portorož

South Africa 
 Music of the Caab Centre – Franschhoek
 Adler Museum of the History of Music – Johannesburg

South Korea 
 Ureuk Museum, course of music in Gaya and Silla – Goryeong, North Gyeongsang Province
 Museum of Musical Instruments of the World (MMIW) – Paju
 Hybe Insight, artist museum – Seoul
 Korean Folk Village – Yongin

Spain 

 Valldemossa Charterhouse, living of Frédéric Chopin – Valldemossa, Mallorca
 Casa–Museo del Timple, local string instruments (timples) – Teguise, Lanzarote

North coast
 , ethnic musical instruments – Avilés, Asturias
 Casa Museo Jesús de Monasterio, de dedicated to Jesús de Monasterio – Cabezón de la Sal, Cantabria
 International Bagpipe Museum – Gijón
 Soinuenea–Herri Musikaren Txokoa, Basque music – Oiartzun, Basque Country

North-east
 Museo del Órgano, dedicated to organs – Agüero, Aragon
 Museo Nino Bravo, dedicated to Nino Bravo – Aielo de Malferit, Valencia
 Museu de la Música de Barcelona – Barcelona
  – Barcelona
 Museo de Música Étnica – Busot, Valencia
 Museu Isaac Albéniz, dedicated to Isaac Albéniz – Camprodon, Catalonia
 Museo Pablo Sarasate, dedicated to Pablo Sarasate – Pamplona, Navarra
 Casa-Museo Julián Gayarre, dedicated to Julián Gayarre – Roncal, Navarra
 Museu Pau Casals, dedicated to Pablo Casals – el Vendrell, Catalonia
 , dedicated to Concha Piquer – Valencia

South
 Museo de la Música Étnica, music cultures worldwide – Barranda, Murcia
 Casa Museo Manuel de Falla, dedicated to Manuel de Falla – Granada
 Casa Museo Andrés Segovia, dedicated to Andrés Segovia – Linares, Jaén
 Museo de Raphael, dedicated to Raphael – Linares, Jaén
  – Málaga
 , dedicated to flamenco – Sevilla
 Museo de la Guitarra – Almeria

Central
 Museo Jacinto Guerrero, dedicated to Jacinto Guerrero – Ajofrín, Toledo
 Museo de Sonidos del Mundo / Museo de Instrumentos – Santo Domingo de Silos, Burgos
 Museo Sara Montiel, dedicated to Sara Montiel – Campo de Criptana, Ciudad Real
 Casa Museo José Padilla, dedicated to José Padilla Sánchez – Madrid
 Fundación Victoria y Joaquín Rodrigo, dedicated to Victoria and Joaquín Rodrigo – Madrid
 Museo Hazen, piano collection – Las Rozas de Madrid, Madrid
 Museo de la Música. Colección Luis Delgado – Urueña, Valladolid

Sweden 

Stockholm
 ABBA: The Museum, dedicated to ABBA
 
 Stockholm Music Museum (1901–2010)
 Swedish Museum of Performing Arts

Other museums
 , dedicated to Jussi Björling – Borlänge
 , dedicated to Bedřich Smetana – Gothenburg
  (2008–2016), dedicated to Evert Taube – Göteborg
 , museum on jazz – Strömsholm
 Guitars – the Museum – Umeå
 Birgit Nilsson Museum, dedicated to Birgit Nilsson
 Zarah Leander-museet, dedicated to Zarah Leander

Switzerland 
 Music Museum – Basel
  – Basel
 Musée Baud, named after instrument builders Frédy, Robert and Auguste Baud – L'Auberson
 , Liestal
 Queen: The Studio Experience, dedicated to Queen – Montreux
 Museum of Timekeeping and Mechanical Musical Instruments – Oberhofen am Thunersee
  – Roche
 Musée d'automates et de boîtes à musique – Sainte-Croix
  – Seewen
 Richard Wagner Museum, Lucerne, dedicated to Richard Wagner – Tribschen
 , jazz museum – Uster

Taiwan 

 Chang Lien-cheng Saxophone Museum – Houli, Taichung
 Chimei Museum, musical collection – Tainan

Tajikistan 
 Gurminj Museum of Musical Instruments – Dushanbe

Tunisia 

 Centre des Musiques Arabes et Méditerranéennes, Ennejma Ezzahra Palace – Sidi Bou Said

Turkey 
 Aynalıkavak Palace, collection of musical instruments – Istanbul

United Kingdom 
London
 Museum of Asian Music – Acton
 Musical Museum – Kew Bridge, Brentford
 Foundling Museum – Bloomsbury
 Horniman Museum, named after Frederick John Horniman – Forest Hill
 British Music Experience (2009–2014) – Greenwich
 Fenton House – Hampstead
 Royal College of Music Museum – Royal College of Music, Kensington
 Royal Academy of Music Museum – Royal Academy of Music, Marylebone Road
 Handel & Hendrix in London, dedicated to George Frideric Handel and Jimi Hendrix – Mayfair
 Eel Pie Island Museum – Twickenham, Richmond upon Thames
 Museum of Army Music – Kneller Hall, Whitton, Richmond upon Thames
 The Royal College of Music Museum – South Kensington

Liverpool
 Cavern Mecca (1981–1984), dedicated to The Beatles
 The Beatles Story, dedicated to The Beatles
 Liverpool Wall of Fame
 251 Menlove Avenue, paternal home of John Lennon
 20 Forthlin Road, birth house Paul McCartney
Liverpool Beatles Museum, created by Roag Best

England (other museums)
 St. Albans Organ Museum – St Albans
 Herschel Museum of Astronomy, musical exhibition, named after William and Caroline Herschel – Bath
 Holburne Museum – Bath
 Royal Birmingham Conservatoire – Birmingham
 Brighton Museum & Art Gallery, musical instruments – Brighton
 Bristol City Museum and Art Gallery, musical instruments – Bristol
 Museum of Archaeology and Anthropology, University of Cambridge – Cambridge
 Coventry Music Museum − The 2-Tone Village, Coventry
 Leith Hill Place, near Dorking, Surrey - former home of Ralph Vaughan Williams and National Trust property
 Mechanical Museum and Doll Collection – Chichester
 Paul Corins Magnificent Music Machines (1967–2013) – Liskerad, Cornwall
 Mechanical Music Museum – Cotton
 Warwick Arts Centre, musical collection – University of Warwick, Coventry
 Hatchlands Park, The Cobbe Collection, keyboard instruments – East Clandon
 Tullie House Museum and Art Gallery, musical instruments – Cumbria
 Finchcocks, historical keyboard instruments (1971–2016) – Goudhurst partly moved to Sevenoaks
 John Taylor & Co, collections bells – Loughborough
 Elgar Birthplace Museum, dedicated to Edward Elgar – Broadheath
 Morpeth Chantry Bagpipe Museum – Morpeth
 Keith Hardings World of Mechanical Music – Northleach
 Bate Collection of Musical Instruments – Oxford
 Ashmolean Museum, musical instruments – Oxford
 Pinchbeck, The Burtey Fen Collection, collection pipe organs – Pinchbeck
 Scarborough Fair Collection, collection mechanical organs – Scarborough
 National Centre for Popular Music (2009–2014) – Sheffield
 American Museum in Britain – Somerset
 Museum of Somerset – Taunton
 Thursford Collection – Thursford
 Museum of Wigan Life – Wigan
 York Minster, musical instruments – York
 York Museums Trust, bells – York

Northern Ireland
 Nerve Centre – Derry

Scotland
 Music museum of the Reid Concert Hall – Edinburgh
 St Cecilia's Hall, musical instruments – Edinburgh
 Russell Collection, musical instruments – Edinburgh
 George Waterston Memorial Centre and Museum, dedicated to George Waterston – Fair Isle
 The Museum of Piping – Glasgow
 Dean Castle, collection of musical instruments – Kilmarnock
 Glenesk Folk Museum – Tarfside

Wales
 National Museum Cardiff, musical instruments – Cardiff
 Tŷ Siamas, national center for folkmusic – Dolgellau

United States 
Mobile
 National Guitar Museum
 New Jersey Music Hall of Fame

Alabama 

 Alabama Jazz Hall of Fame – Birmingham
 W. C. Handy Home, Museum & Library, dedicated to W. C. Handy – Florence
 Hank Williams Boyhood Home & Museum, dedicated to Hank Williams – Georgiana
 The Hank Williams Museum, dedicated to Hank Williams – Montgomery
 Muscle Shoals Sound Studio Museum – Sheffield
 National Band Association Hall of Fame of Distinguished Band Conductors, Troy University – Troy
 Alabama Music Hall of Fame – Tuscumbia
 Commodore Museum, dedicated to the Commodores – Tuskegee

Arizona 

 Musical Instrument Museum – Phoenix

Arkansas 

 Delta Cultural Center – Helena
 Guitar Museum – Jacksonville
 Ozark Folk Center – Mountain View

California 

 Buck Owens Crystal Palace, dedicated to Buck Owens – Bakersfield
 Museum of Making Music – Carlsbad
 Grammy Museum at L.A. Live – Los Angeles
 Songwriters Hall of Fame – Los Angeles
 Sacramento Rock and Radio Museum – Sacramento
 Nethercutt Collection – Sylmar, San Fernando Valley
 Ira F. Brilliant Center for Beethoven Studies, dedicated to Ludwig van Beethoven – San Jose

Colorado 

 Colorado Music Hall of Fame – Red Rocks Amphitheatre near Morrison

Connecticut 

 Museum of Fife & Drum – Ivoryton
 Yale University Collection of Musical Instruments – New Haven

Florida 

 Latin Music Hall of Fame Museum – Miami
 Down Beat Jazz Hall of Fame, Universal Studios' City Jazz – Orlando
 Florida Artists Hall of Fame, Florida State Capitol – Tallahassee
 Stephen Foster Folk Culture Center State Park, dedicated to Stephen Foster – White Springs

Georgia 

  – Atlanta
 Trap Music Museum, dedicated to rapper T.I. – Atlanta
 Georgia Music Hall of Fame – Macon
 The Allman Brothers Band Museum, dedicated to The Allman Brothers Band – Macon
 The Little Richard House and Museum, dedicated to Little Richard – Macon

Illinois 
 Place de la Musique – Barrington Hills
 Rock N Roll McDonald's (1983–2018, as restaurant museum) – Chicago
 Illinois Rock & Roll Museum on Rt. 66 – Joliet
 David Adler Music and Arts Center – Libertyville
 Sousa Archives and Center for American Music – Urbana

Indiana 
Dr. Ted's Musical Marvels, named after Ted Waflart – Huntingburg
Great American Songbook Foundation – Carmel
Rhythm! Discovery Center – Indianapolis
Zaharakos Ice Cream Parlor and Museum – Columbus

Iowa 

 America's Old-Time Country Music Hall Of Fame – Anita
 Iowa Rock 'n' Roll Hall of Fame – Arnolds Park
 Glenn Miller Birthplace Museum, dedicated to Glenn Miller – Clarinda
 River Music Experience – Davenport
 Music Man Square, dedicated to Meredith Willson and his musical The Music Man – Mason City
 Bily Clocks Museum, partly dedicated to Antonín Dvořák – Spillville
 Surf Ballroom & Museum – Clear Lake

Kentucky 

  – Mount Vernon
 International Bluegrass Music Hall of Fame – Owensboro
 U.S. 23 Country Music Highway Museum – Paintsville
 Francis M. Stafford House – Paintsville
 Bill Monroe Museum, dedicated to Bill Monroe – Rosine

Louisiana 

 Louisiana Music Hall of Fame – Baton Rouge
 Cajun Music Hall of Fame, dedicated to Cajun music – Eunice
 Delta Music Museum – Ferriday
 Rebel State Historic Site – Marthaville
 New Orleans Mint (music collection went to Jazz Museum) – New Orleans
 New Orleans Jazz Museum – New Orleans

Maine 

 Bryant Stove & Music Museum – Thorndike

Maryland 

 Bagpipe Museum – Ellicott City
 Strathmore – North Bethesda

Massachusetts 

 Frederick Historical Piano Collection – Ashburnham
 Museum of Fine Arts Boston, musical instruments collection – Boston

Michigan 

 Music House Museum – Acme
 Stearns Collection of Musical Instruments – Ann Arbor
 Motown Museum – Detroit
 Rhythm and Blues Music Hall of Fame – Detroit 
 International Gospel Music Hall of Fame and Museum – Detroit
 Carnegie Center, Port Huron Museum, musical collection – Port Huron
 Tuba Museum, dedicated to the tuba – Okemos

Minnesota 

 Minnesota Music Hall of Fame – New Ulm
 Paisley Park Studios, dedicated to Prince – Chanhassen
 Schubert Club, named after Franz Schubert – Saint Paul

Mississippi 

 Mississippi John Hurt Museum, dedicated to Mississippi John Hurt – Carrollton
 Delta Blues Museum – Clarksdale
 Rock & Blues Museum – Clarksdale
 The Grammy Museum Mississippi – Cleveland
 Greenwood Blues Heritage Museum & Gallery – Greenwood
 Robert Johnson Blues Museum, dedicated to Robert Johnson – Crystal Springs
 Mississippi Music Museum – Hazlehurst
 Graceland Too (1990–2014) – Holly Springs
 B.B. King Museum and Delta Interpretive Center, dedicated to B.B. King – Indianola
 Mississippi Musicians Hall of Fame – Jackson
 Highway 61 Blues Museum – Leland
 Hartley Peavey Visitor Center, dedicated to Peavey – Meridian
 Highland Park, dedicated to Jimmie Rodgers – Meridian
 Charles H. Templeton, Sr. Music Museum, musical collection – Starkville
 Gateway to the Blues Visitors Center and Museum – Tunica
 Elvis Presley Birthplace, dedicated to Elvis Presley – Tupelo
 Howlin' Wolf Museum, dedicated to Howlin' Wolf – West Point

Missouri 

  – Branson
 American Jazz Museum – Kansas City
 National Blues Museum – St. Louis
 Scott Joplin House State Historic Site, dedicated to Scott Joplin – St. Louis
 Steel Guitar Hall of Fame – St. Louis

Nebraska 

 Omaha Black Music Hall of Fame – Omaha

Nevada 
 Liberace Museum Collection – Paradise
 Elvis-A-Rama Museum (1999–2006) – dedicated to Elvis Presley, Paradise
 The King's Ransom Museum, dedicated to Elvis Presley – Las Vegas

New Jersey 

 Morris Museum – Morristown
 Grammy Museum Experience – Newark

New York 

New York City and Long Island
 Universal Hip Hop Museum – The Bronx
 Brooklyn Jazz Hall of Fame and Museum – Brooklyn
 National Jazz Museum – Harlem
 Hip Hop Hall of Fame – Harlem
 Long Island Music Hall of Fame – Melville, Huntington
 Metropolitan Museum of Art, circa 5,000 instruments – Manhattan
 New York Jazz Museum – Manhattan
 ARChive of Contemporary Music – Manhattan
 Rose Museum, memorial of the debut of the Vienna Philharmonic – Carnegie Hall, Manhattan
 Strawberry Fields, dedicated to John Lennon – Central Park, Manhattan
 Louis Armstrong House Museum, dedicated to Louis Armstrong – Queens

Other museums
 Bethel Woods Center for the Arts – Bethel (Woodstock site)
 Marcella Sembrich Opera Museum, dedicated to Marcella Sembrich – Bolton Landing, Warren County
 New York State Country Music Hall of Fame – Cortland
 Original American Kazoo Factory and Museum, dedicated the kazoo – Eden
 Fiddler's Hall of Fame and Museum, dedicated to fiddlers – Redfield
 Empire State Theater Musical Instrument Museum – Syracuse

North Carolina 

 Curb Museum for Music and Motorsports – Kannapolis
 North Carolina Music Hall of Fame – Kannapolis
 Earl Scruggs Center, Cleveland County Courthouse, dedicated to Earl Scruggs – Shelby

North Dakota 
 Ray Opera House Museum – Ray

Ohio 

 Ted Lewis Museum, dedicated to Ted Lewis – Circleville
 American Classical Music Hall of Fame and Museum – Cincinnati
 Verdin Bell and Clock Museum – Cincinnati
 Rock and Roll Hall of Fame – Cleveland
 Polka Hall of Fame – Euclid

Oklahoma 

 Roger Miller Museum, dedicated to Roger Miller – Erick
 Oklahoma Music Hall of Fame – Muskogee
 American Banjo Museum – Oklahoma City
 Washington Irving Trail Museum, country music collection, named after Washington Irving – Ripley
 Oklahoma Jazz Hall of Fame – Tulsa
 Woody Guthrie Center, dedicated to Woody Guthrie and includes the archives of Phil Ochs – Tulsa

Oregon 

 Schuman Instrument Collection – Southern Oregon University, Ashland

Pennsylvania 

 Liberty Bell Museum – Allentown
 DeBence Antique Music World – Franklin
 Wolf Museum of Music and Art – Lancaster County
 American Treasure Tour – Oaks, Montgomery County
 Martin Guitar Museum, named after C. F. Martin & Company – Nazareth
 New Holland Band Museum – New Holland
 Bayernhof Music Museum – O'Hara Township
 Marian Anderson House, dedicated to Marian Anderson – Philadelphia
 Stephen Foster Memorial, dedicated to Stephen Foster – University of Pittsburgh, Pittsburgh
 Phillip Paul Bliss House, named after Philip Bliss – Rome
 Vocal Group Hall of Fame – Sharon

South Carolina 

 The Kazoo Museum, dedicated to the kazoo – Beaufort
 Carolina Music Museum – Heritage Green
 Sigal Music Museum formerly the Carolina Music Museum – Heritage Green

South Dakota 

 National Music Museum – Vermillion

Tennessee 

 West Tennessee Delta Heritage Center, musical museum and dedication to Tina Turner – Brownsville
 Rockabilly Hall of Fame – Burns
 Southern Gospel Museum and Hall of Fame – Dollywood
 Chasing Rainbows Museum, dedicated to Dolly Parton – Dollywood
 Loretta Lynn Ranch, dedicated to Loretta Lynn – Hurricane Mills
 International Rock-a-billy Hall of Fame – Jackson
 Mountain Music Museum – Kingsport
 James D. Vaughan Museum, dedicated to James David Vaughan – Lawrenceburg
 Graceland, dedicated to Elvis Presley – Memphis
 Blues Hall of Fame – Memphis
 Memphis Music Hall of Fame – Memphis
 Memphis Rock N' Soul Museum – Memphis
 W. C. Handy Museum, dedicated to W. C. Handy – Memphis
 Stax Museum of American Soul Music – Memphis
 Johnny Cash Museum, dedicated to Johnny Cash – Nashville
 Patsy Cline Museum, dedicated to Patsy Cline – Nashville
 Willie Nelson and Friends Museum, dedicated to Willie Nelson – Nashville
 Country Music Hall of Fame and Museum – Nashville
 Music City Walk of Fame – Nashville
 Gospel Music Hall of Fame – Nashville
 Musicians Hall of Fame and Museum – Nashville
 Nashville Songwriters Hall of Fame – Nashville
 Museum of Appalachia, Hall of Fame and permanent collection of Uncle Dave Macon – Norris
 , dedicated to Elvis Presley and others – Pigeon Forge

Texas 

 Tejano Roots Museum, dedicated to Tejano music – Alice
 South Austin Museum of Popular Culture – Austin
 Texas Music Museum – Austin
 Texas Polka Music Museum – Austin
 Heart of Texas Country Music Museum – Brady
 Texas Country Music Hall of Fame – Carthage
 Western Music Association Hall of Fame – Coppell
 The Selena Museum, dedicated to Selena Quintanilla – Corpus Christi
 Lefty Frizzell Museum, dedicated to Lefty Frizzell – Corsicana
 Texas Musicians Museum – Hillsboro
 Jukebox Museum – Houston
 Texas Musicians Museum (?-2018) – Irving
 Buddy Holly Center, dedicated to Buddy Holly and Texan music – Lubbock
 Blues & History Museum – Navasota
 Smitty's Juke Box Museum – Pharr
 Freddy Fender Museum, named after Freddy Fender – San Benito
 Texas Conjunto Music Museum – San Benito
 Sherman Jazz Museum – Sherman
 Bob Wills Museum, dedicated to Bob Wills – Turkey
 Roy Orbison Museum, dedicated to Roy Orbison – Wink

Utah 
 Utah Cowboy and Western Heritage Museum – Ogden

Virginia 

 Birthplace of Country Music Museum – Bristol
 Ralph Stanley Museum, dedicated to Ralph Stanley – Clintwood
 Blue Ridge Institute & Museum, musical collection – Ferrum
 Blue Ridge Music Center – Galax
 Carter Family Fold, dedicated to the Carter Family – Hiltons, Scott County
 Virginia Musical Museum – Williamsburg

Washington 
 Museum of Pop Culture, formerly Experience Music Project – Seattle

West Virginia 
 Gorby's Vintage Instrument Museum – South Charleston
West Virginia Music Hall of Fame

Washington, D.C. 
 O Street Museum Foundation

Uzbekistan 
 Memorial house museum of Tamara Khanum – Tashkent

References 

Music
Museums